Ildikó Szekeres (born 21 July 1955) is a Hungarian former swimmer. She competed in two events at the 1972 Summer Olympics.

References

1955 births
Living people
Hungarian female swimmers
Olympic swimmers of Hungary
Swimmers at the 1972 Summer Olympics
Sportspeople from Pécs